A wind chill advisory is a hazardous weather statement issued by Weather Forecast Offices (WFO) of the National Weather Service (NWS) in the United States to alert the public that wind chills are forecast to reach values low enough that it poses a threat to human health and life if adequate protection is not taken against hypothermia and frostbite. The exact criteria meriting the issuance of an advisory varies from state to state, and areas prone to colder temperatures will often require the wind chill to be lower before issuing an advisory.

Example
The following is an example of a wind chill advisory issued by the National Weather Service office in Detroit, Michigan.

920 
WWUS43 KDTX 212131
WSWDTX

URGENT - WINTER WEATHER MESSAGE
NATIONAL WEATHER SERVICE DETROIT/PONTIAC MI
431 PM EST FRI JAN 21 2011

...EXTREME COLD WIND CHILLS TONIGHT...

.COLD TEMPERATURES IN ADDITION TO WINDS INCREASING TONIGHT AHEAD OF
A LOW PRESSURE SYSTEM WILL ALLOW WIND CHILLS TO DROP BETWEEN -15
AND -20 ACROSS THE NORTHERN THUMB AND SAGINAW VALLEY TONIGHT.

MIZ047>049-053>055-062-063-220545-
/O.NEW.KDTX.WC.Y.0001.110122T0500Z-110122T1500Z/
MIDLAND-BAY-HURON-SAGINAW-TUSCOLA-SANILAC-LAPEER-ST. CLAIR-
INCLUDING THE CITIES OF...MIDLAND...BAY CITY...BAD AXE...
SAGINAW...CARO...SANDUSKY...LAPEER...PORT HURON
431 PM EST FRI JAN 21 2011

...WIND CHILL ADVISORY IN EFFECT FROM MIDNIGHT TONIGHT TO 10 AM
EST SATURDAY...

THE NATIONAL WEATHER SERVICE IN DETROIT/PONTIAC HAS ISSUED A WIND
CHILL ADVISORY...WHICH IS IN EFFECT FROM MIDNIGHT TONIGHT TO
10 AM EST SATURDAY. 

IMPACTS...

 * COLD WIND CHILLS MAY LEAD TO FROST BITE AND HYPOTHERMIA IF
   PRECAUTIONS ARE NOT TAKEN. 

HAZARDOUS WEATHER...

 * WIND CHILLS ARE EXPECTED TO FALL BETWEEN -15 AND -20 DEGREES
   LATE TONIGHT THROUGH TOMORROW MORNING.

PRECAUTIONARY/PREPAREDNESS ACTIONS...

 * A WIND CHILL ADVISORY MEANS THAT VERY COLD AIR AND STRONG
WINDS WILL COMBINE TO GENERATE LOW WIND CHILLS. THIS WILL RESULT
IN FROST BITE AND LEAD TO HYPOTHERMIA IF PRECAUTIONS ARE NOT
TAKEN.  IF YOU MUST VENTURE OUTDOORS...MAKE SURE YOU WEAR A HAT
AND GLOVES.

&&

$$

RK

See also
 Severe weather terminology (United States)

References

External links
 National Weather Service

Weather warnings and advisories